Pizzarello is:

- an Italian traditional food from Puglia, a region in the southern part of Italy. It is called Pizzarello or "Pizzaridd" in the southern dialect;

- an Italian surname. Notable people with the surname include:

 Alberto Pizzarello, Gibraltarian poet
 Sandra Pizzarello (born 1933), Italian biochemist

See also 
 Asteroid 7377 Pizzarello, named after Sandra Pizzarello
 Pizzarelli

Italian-language surnames